Betzy Casandra Cuevas Araujo (born 21 April 1997), known as Casandra Cuevas or Betzy Cuevas, is a Mexican professional footballer who plays as a midfielder for Liga MX Femenil side Club América. Cuevas is one of the player with the most match appearances in Liga MX Femenil.

Club career

Club América (2017-2019) 
Cuevas started her professional career with Club América in 2017, being part of the squad of América Femenil that participated in the first official tournament for the club, the 2017 Copa MX Femenil. Cuevas was a key player for América during the first seasons of the team, and was vital to obtain the first Liga MX Femenil title for the club during the Apertura 2018 tournament in which she scored 10 goals, including one on the first leg of the final.

2019: Loan to Club Tijuana 
Cuevas joined Tijuana on loan ahead of the Apertura 2019 tournament. On her first and only tournament at Tijuana, Cuevas made 18 appearances and scored 5 goals, helping the team reach the playoffs for the first time.

Club América (2019-present) 
Cuevas returned to America from the loan at Tijuana ahead of the Clausura 2020 tournament.

References

External links 
 Casandra Cuevas at Club América
 
 
 

1997 births
Living people
Mexican women's footballers
Women's association football midfielders